Surajit Kar Purkayastha (born 1 January 1957) is a retired senior Indian Police Service officer of 1985 West Bengal cadre who served as the State Security Advisor of West Bengal from 1 June 2018 to 31 May 2021. Prior to that, he served as Director General of Police of West Bengal and was the 36th Police Commissioner of Kolkata.

Education
Purkayastha holds a Mechanical engineering degree from Indian Institute of Technology, Kharagpur also completed PGDIT from Indian Institute of Foreign Trade (IIFT), New Delhi and after completion of his studies he joined Calcutta Electric Supply Corporation.

Police career
Purkayastha is an officer of 1985 West Bengal cadre, who completed his Indian Police Service training in Burdwan district. His first posting was at Bolpur subdivision as SDPO in Birbhum district. He has also worked as Additional Superintendent of Police in South 24 Parganas district and also as Addl. SP, Asansol and Addl SP, Barrackpore. He later worked in Kolkata Police in various posts like DC Security Control, DCDD, DC Traffic, etc. After that he became the Superintendent of Police of Howrah and then went to Iran as a Research and Analysis Wing (R&AW) officer and stayed there for 5 years. He also held the ranks of DIG-Vigilance, DIG PR, IG-South Bengal, IG-Law and Order. Then he became ADG- Law and Order before assuming the office of Police Commissioner of Kolkata.

As Police Commissioner of Kolkata
On 13 February 2013, Purkayastha was appointed as the 36th Police Commissioner of Kolkata replacing Ranjit Kumar Panchananda. He served as the Commissioner for three years and was succeeded by Rajeev Kumar.

As the Director General of Police
After serving as Police Commissioner of Kolkata for three years, Purkayastha was appointed as the DGP of the state succeeding G. M. P. Reddy and served as the State Police chief for two years until 31 May 2018 when he was succeeded by Virendra.

As the State Security Advisor
After his retirement, the state government created a post for Purkayastha -- State Security Advisor, on the lines of the National Security Advisor (NSA).

See also
IPS
Police
Soumen Mitra

References

Living people
Indian Police Service officers
 IIT Kharagpur alumni
1957 births